James J. Schmitt (born June 7, 1958) is an American politician from Wisconsin. A Republican, he served as the mayor of Green Bay, Wisconsin, from 2003 to 2019, becoming the city's longest-serving mayor.

Personal life
The fourth of 11 children born to James and Mary (née Gleichner) Schmitt in Two Rivers, Wisconsin, he attended Roncalli High School and St. Norbert College He is an active Roman Catholic, and one of his brothers was ordained into religious life.

In 2011 he was recognized by the Green Bay Press-Gazette editorial board as Person of the Year.

Career

Business
In the private sector, Schmitt was president of Famis Manufacturing Inc. and in 1997 received the Green Bay Area Chamber of Commerce Small Business Entrepreneur of the Year award.

Politics
Schmitt served two consecutive terms on the Brown County Board of Supervisors.  On April 1, 2003 he was elected the 41st mayor of Green Bay, Wisconsin, succeeding Paul Jadin who had not sought re-election.

In 2007, Schmitt was re-elected with 70% of the vote and won again in April 2011. He serves on the Advisory Board of both the U.S. Conference of Mayors and the League of Wisconsin Municipalities.

On February 17, 2015, Schmitt received 51 percent of the vote in a three-way primary. He went on to defeat Tom DeWane 53% to 47%.  With this victory, Schmitt extended his tenure to 16 years and overtook Sam Halloin as the longest-serving mayor in Green Bay history.

Campaign finance investigation
In January 2015, Green Bay city council Aldermen Chris Wery, Guy Zima, and Andy Nicholson alleged that Schmitt had accepted as much as $10,000 in illegal donations for his mayoral campaign. Schmitt contended that the errors were unintentional and handed his records over to the Brown County District Attorney and the Wisconsin Government Accountability Board to be audited. Due to a potential conflict of interest, the Brown County District Attorney turned the records over to the Milwaukee County District Attorney.

In September 2016, Schmitt agreed to plead guilty as part of a plea agreement to three misdemeanor charges, including false statements to an election official, accepting campaign contributions not belonging to the reported contributor, and accepting campaign contributions in excess of state limits. He was subsequently convicted on these criminal charges and sentenced to a monetary forfeiture and community service.

It was found that 17 individuals had donated more than the $1,040 contribution limit, and there were two corporate donations, which are illegal under state election laws.

On February 20, 2017, the Common Council held a vote on the removal of Schmitt over campaign finance violations. While a majority of the 12 member board voted for removal, 9 votes were necessary to remove the mayor from office. As only 8 voted for removal, he retained his seat by one vote.

In 2017, seven City Council members signed a letter stating their disapproval of the conduct of one of Schmitt's accusers, Alderman Chris Wery, who used his bank job to pry into an opponent's financial records.

Family
Schmitt married Dona Degenhardt on May 26, 1990. They have three living children (all daughters) and another child who died in infancy.

See also
2003 Green Bay mayoral election
2007 Green Bay mayoral election
2011 Green Bay mayoral election
2015 Green Bay mayoral election

References

External links
Green Bay mayor website

1958 births
Living people
People from Two Rivers, Wisconsin
St. Norbert College alumni
Businesspeople from Wisconsin
County supervisors in Wisconsin
Mayors of Green Bay, Wisconsin
Harvard Kennedy School alumni
American people of German descent
Wisconsin Republicans
21st-century American politicians
Catholics from Wisconsin